Pittasoma is a genus of birds in the gnateater family. Its two members breed in subtropical or tropical moist forest in South and Central America, specifically the Chocó, and Panama and Costa Rica. Formerly placed in the family Formicariidae, they were reclassified to Conopophagidae following analysis of mtDNA cytochrome b and NADH dehydrogenase subunit 2 sequences (Rice, 2005a,b). The association between the genus Pittasoma and the 'traditional' gnateaters is also supported by traits in their natural history, morphology, vocalizations (Rice, 2005a).

They are round, short-tailed, and long-legged birds, 16–19 cm (6-7½ inches) in length, making them the largest members of the gnateater family. These terrestrial birds are quite upright when standing. Sexes differ in plumage, but sexual dichromatism is less pronounced than in most members of the other gnateater genus,  Conopophaga. They are insectivorous.

Species

References
Rice, Nathan H. (2005a): Phylogenetic relationships of antpitta genera (Passeriformes: Formicariidae). Auk 122(2): 673–683. [English with Spanish abstract] DOI:10.1642/0004-8038(2005)122[0673:PROAGP]2.0.CO;2 PDF fulltext
Rice, Nathan H. (2005b): Further Evidence for Paraphyly of the Formicariidae (Passeriformes). Condor 107(4): 910–915. [English with Spanish abstract]  PDF fulltext
Whitney, B.M. (2003) Family Conopophagidae (Gnateaters) Pp 732–748 in del Hoyo J., Elliott A. & Christie D.A. (2003) Handbook of the Birds of the World. Volume 8. Broadbills to Tapaculos Lynx Edicions, Barcelona 

 
Bird genera